Joe Town is a village, near Newton, in the Western Area Rural District of Sierra Leone. Joe Town is about twenty five miles outside Freetown.

The main industry in Joe town is farming. The village is inhabited by several ethnic groups, and the primary language of communication in Joe Town is the Krio language. The village is home to the St. Joseph Primary School at Joe Town.

External links
http://weather.mirbig.net/en/SL/04/2408407_Joe+Town
http://www.thepatrioticvanguard.com/spip.php?article5786

Villages in Sierra Leone
Western Area